Benjamin Anthony Johnson (born 24 January 2000) is an English professional footballer who plays as a right back or left back for  club West Ham United.

Early and personal life
Johnson was born in Waltham Forest, Greater London. He is second cousins with former Manchester United and England full-back Paul Parker and former England and Tottenham Hotspur defender Ledley King.

Club career
Johnson joined West Ham United at the age of seven. Originally an attacking winger, Johnson was converted to a full-back as his youth career progressed. He was named on the bench for West Ham's 2–1 loss at Manchester City on 3 December 2017, and he signed his first professional contract when he turned 18 in January 2018.

On 27 February 2019, Johnson made his Premier League debut for West Ham, starting at left-back away at champions Manchester City in a 1–0 defeat at the City of Manchester Stadium. Two serious hamstring injuries and the form of fellow defender, Jeremy Ngakia prevented Johnson from making another appearance until 17 July 2020 when he played in West Ham's 3–1 win against Watford.

On 27 December 2020, Johnson scored his first goal for the Hammers and first professional goal, against Brighton & Hove Albion to level in a game which finished 2–2.

In August 2021, Johnson won West Ham's Young Player of the Season award, after making 20 appearances for the first team in the 2020–21 season.

On 20 March 2022, during a 3–1 defeat away to Tottenham, Johnson made his 50th first team appearance for West Ham, a month after having a two-year contract extension triggered by the club.

In May 2022, for the second season running, Johnson won the Young Player of the Season award, newly named the Mark Noble award.

International career
Johnson received his first international call up on 18 March 2022, named in the England U21 squad for vital UEFA European Under-21 Championship qualifiers against Andorra and Albania. He made his debut during a 3–0 victory away to the latter on 29 March 2022.

Career statistics

Honours

Individual
West Ham United Young Player of the Year: 2020–21, 2021–22

References

External links
 Ben Johnson at West Ham United F.C. (archive)
 
 
 

2000 births
Living people
Footballers from the London Borough of Waltham Forest
English footballers
Association football defenders
West Ham United F.C. players
Premier League players
England under-21 international footballers
Black British sportsmen